Chandana Dixit is a Bollywood playback singer who started her career as a dubbing artist and later went on to sing popular songs such as "Husn Hain Suhana" (Coolie No. 1), "Shahar Ki Ladki" (Rakshak), "Chumma Chumma" (Daanveer), "Tujhe Khaas Fursat" (Auzaar) and "Khul Gaya Naseeb" (Bhai). She has worked with music composers Anand–Milind and Anu Malik. She also recorded the title track of the television series Shagun which aired on Star Plus in the afternoon slot.

Dixit recorded the hugely popular song "Husn Hain Suhana" from the film Coolie No. 1, which was to be dubbed later by another singer. However, music composers Anand–Milind, producer Vashu Bhagnani, and director David Dhawan all felt that her version should be used as final track. She went on to sing other popular songs for the composer duo which included "Shahar Ki Ladki" from Rakshak.

Dixit moved to the U.S. state of Washington with her husband in 2002. As of 2014, she lives in Redmond, Washington, where she teaches music.

References

External links
 
 Husn Hai Suhana 2.o Lyrics
 

Bollywood playback singers
Indian women playback singers
Living people
Year of birth missing (living people)